Raul: Straight to Kill is a 2005  Italian crime-drama film directed by Andrea Bolognini. It was awarded best film at the 2005 BAFF film festival. The score by Andrea Morricone was nominated for best music at the Italian Golden Globes.

Cast 
Stefano Dionisi: Raul
Violante Placido: Sonia
Nicola Farron: Mario
Giancarlo Giannini: Judge Porfirio
Alessandro Haber: Matteo Mariotti
Ernesto Mahieux: Patruno
Maurizio Mattioli: Caretti
Guia Jelo: Caterina  
Laura Betti: Usurer
Laura Troschel: Maitresse

See also  
 List of Italian films of 2005

References

External links

Italian crime drama films
2005 crime drama films
2005 films
2000s Italian-language films
2000s Italian films